"Pirouette Cacahuète", sometimes written as "Pirouette, Cacahuète", also known under the title "Il était un petit homme", is a popular French children's song or comptine (a nursery rhyme or a "counting-out song").

History 
The author is very probably Gabrielle Grandière, born in 1920, resident of Ruaudin, a commune in the Sarthe department, who, at the time of creation of the comptine, was a teacher in Alençon. The slight doubt arises from the fact that she didn't claim authorship until 2012, 60 year later.

Structure 
It was originally organized into five stanzas of the same structure (A — Pirouette Cacahuète — A — B — B). A more recent variant adds three stanzas and concludes with an invitation to applaud.

References

Further reading
 Le catalogue de la chanson folklorique française, Volume 22, by Conrad Laforte.

External links 
 

French children's songs
Year of song unknown